Ready is a surname. Notable people with the surname include:

Charles Ready (1802–1878), American politician from Tennessee; U.S. representative 1853–59
Gene Ready (1941–2015), American politician and businessman
John Ready (1777–1845), British army officer and politician
Justin Ready (born 1982), American politician
Karl Ready (born 1972), Welsh professional football player
Paul Ready, British actor
Randy Ready (born 1960), American professional baseball player
Rudolph Ready (1878–1958), Australian politician
Ryan Ready (born 1978), Canadian professional ice hockey player
Stephanie Ready, American sports reporter and basketball coach
Troy Ready (born 1980), American soccer player

See also
Reddy (Irish surname)